Sigurd Håkonsson (died 962) (Old Norse: Sigurðr Hákonarson) was a Norwegian nobleman and Jarl of Lade in Trøndelag.

 
Sigurd Håkonsson Ladejarl was the son of Håkon Grjotgardsson, the first Jarl of Lade (Old Norse Hlaðir).  In 900, Håkon came into conflict with Atle Mjove over Sogn and fought a battle at Fjaler (Old Norse: Fjalir), in which Håkon was killed. Upon reaching maturity, Sigurd inherited his father's position. Sigurd Håkonsson was married to Bergljot Toresdatter, daughter of Tore Teiande Ragnvaldsson (Thorir Rögnvaldarson)  and Ålov Årbot Haraldsdatter. In 892, Tore Ragnvaldsson became Jarl of Møre after the death of his father, Ragnvald Eysteinsson.

During the reign of King Haakon I of Norway, Sigurd had an influential position as the king's friend and adviser. He sought in particular to mediate between the king and the people during the king's attempt to introduce Christianity.  After the death of Haakon at the Battle of Fitjar (Slaget ved Fitjar på Stord) in 961, Harald Greycloak, the son of Eirik Bloodaxe and his brothers became kings of Norway.

In autumn 962, Sigurd Håkonsson and his warriors were burnt to death by Harald Greycloak, while staying the night at Aglo, in modern-day Skatval in the municipality of Stjørdal. Sigurd was killed as part of Harald's effort to reunite all of Norway under his rule. In 970, his killing was later avenged by Sigurd's son, Haakon Sigurdsson, who had become an ally of King Harold Bluetooth.

Sigurd had Kormákr Ögmundarson as a court poet. Fragments of Kormákr's lay on Sigurd Håkonsson, Sigurðardrápa, are preserved in Skáldskaparmál and in Heimskringla.

References

Primary Sources
The  primary records are from the Heimskringla by Snorri Sturlasson.

Other sources
Hollander, Lee M. (Ed.) (1949) The Sagas of Kormák and The Sworn Brothers (Princeton University Press for the American-Scandinavian Foundation)
Hreinsson, Viðar(Ed.) (1997) The Complete Sagas of Icelanders - Volume I (Reykjavík: Leifur Eiríksson Publishing) 
Stenersen, Øyvind; Libæk, Ivar (2003). The History of Norway (. Lysaker: Forlaget Historie og Kultur) 
Thuesen, Nils Petter (2011). Norges historie ( Oslo: Forlaget Historie og Kultur) ]

962 deaths
Ladejarl dynasty
Norwegian earls
10th-century rulers in Europe